The men's shot put event at the 2006 Commonwealth Games was held on March 19–20.

Medalists

Results

Qualification
Qualification: 19.50 m (Q) or at least 12 best (q) qualified for the final.

Final

References
Results

Shot
2006